

Plants

Ferns and fern allies

Conifers

Flowering plants

Arthropods

Insects

Archosaurs
 Wieland claims to have found stegosaur gastroliths.
 Brown argues that Wieland's alleged stegosaur gastroliths were "not associated with the stegosaur bones in question."
 Possible hadrosaur gastroliths documented.

Newly named ornithodirans
Data courtesy of George Olshevsky's dinosaur genera list.

Synapsids

Non-mammalian

References

 Brown, B. (1907). Gastroliths, Science, 25(636), p392.
 Sanders F, Manley K, Carpenter K. Gastroliths from the Lower Cretaceous sauropod Cedarosaurus weiskopfae. In: Tanke D.H, Carpenter K, editors. Mesozoic vertebrate life: new research inspired by the paleontology of Philip J. Currie. Indiana University Press; Bloomington, IN: 2001. pp. 166–180.
 Wieland, G.R. (1907). Gastroliths. Science, 628:66-67.